The 2003–04 Ukrainian First League was the thirteenth season of the Ukrainian First League (football) which was won by Zakarpattia Uzhhorod. The season started on July 18, 2003, and finished on June 18, 2004.

Promotion and relegation

Promoted teams 
Two clubs promoted from the 2002–03 Ukrainian Second League.
Group A
 none
Group B
 Nafkom-Akademiya Irpin – champion (debut)
Group C
 Zorya Luhansk – champion (returning after five seasons)

Relegated teams 
One club was relegated from the 2002-03 Ukrainian Top League:
 Metalist Kharkiv – 14th place (returning after five seasons)

Renamed teams 
 Before the season FC Krasyliv changed to FC Krasyliv-Obolon .
 Before the season FC Vinnytsia changed its name to FC Nyva Vinnytsia.
 During the winter break FC Systema-Boreks Borodianka changed to FC Boreks-Borysfen Borodianka.
 During the second half FC Spartak Sumy changed to FC Spartak-Horobyna Sumy.

Teams 
In 2003-04 season, the Ukrainian First League consists of the following teams:

Final table 

 Krasyliv-Obolon Krasyliv 13th 2003/04, farm club for Premier League club Obolon Kyiv, broke operations and merged with FC Podillya Khmelnytskyi. The club is changing its name to Podillya Khmelnytskyi and moving to Khmelnytskyi. FC Podillya Khmelnytskyi finished 2nd in Druha Liha Group A (Western Ukraine) in 2003/04 and will reorganize in amateur level.
 Nafkom-Akademija Irpen 14th 2003/04, moved to Brovary and changed their name to Nafkom Brovary.
 Zirka Kirovohrad 16th Premier League 2003/04 was relegated to First Division, but informed the Ukrainian Football Federation (UFF) that they wished to reorganize their operations, therefore it will enter the 2004/05 competition in Druha Liha B. Nonetheless, the UFF reinstalled FC Polissya Zhytomyr (18th 2003/04) since, the 16th, FC Karpaty-2 Lviv could not remain in First Division, because their senior club was also relegated to Persha Liha, and the 17th Borex-Borysfen Borodyanka also became insolvent and chose to reorganize in the Druha Liha.
 Naftovyk Okhtyrka change their name to Naftovyk-Ukrnafta Okhtyrka July 15, 2004.

Top scorers 
Statistics are taken from here.

References 

Ukrainian First League seasons
2003–04 in Ukrainian association football leagues
Ukra